Richards Inlet is a large ice-filled inlet at the mouth of Lennox-King Glacier, opening to the Ross Ice Shelf just southeast of Lewis Ridge. Named by the New Zealand Geological Survey Antarctic Expedition (NZGSAE) (1959–60) for R.W. Richards, a member of the Ross Sea Party of the Imperial Trans-Antarctic Expedition (1914–17), who assisted in laying depots as far south as Mount Hope for Shackleton's proposed crossing of Antarctica.
 

Inlets of Antarctica
Shackleton Coast